Serandías is one of seven parishes (administrative divisions) in Boal, a municipality, within the province and autonomous community of Asturias, in northern Spain.

Villages
 Cabanastrabazas
 Llanteiro
 Miñagón
 Teiciellos
 Villanova
 El Villar de Serandías
 Mezá

References

Parishes in Boal